Maria Schrader (born 27 September 1965) is a German actress, screenwriter, and director. She directed the award-winning 2007 film Love Life and the 2020 Netflix miniseries Unorthodox, for which she won the Primetime Emmy Award for Outstanding Directing for a Limited Series. She also starred in the German international hit TV series Deutschland 83 (2015), known for being the first German-language series broadcast on US television.

Early life and career
Schrader was born in Hanover and studied at the Max Reinhardt Seminar in Vienna, Austria.

She is especially well known from the film Aimée & Jaguar, as well as the acclaimed Liebesleben ("Love life") that she wrote, produced, and in which she acted. She has also written other films: RobbyKallePaul; I Was on Mars; Stille Nacht and Meschugge. She co-directed I Was on Mars with Dani Levy, whom she dated until 1999.

Schrader was part of the jury at the Berlin International Film Festival in 2000.

Schrader played the part of Martin Rauch's aunt in Deutschland 83 (2015), an 8 episode TV series, which was the first German-language TV series to be broadcast on US television. It also became popular in the UK, airing in early 2016 on Channel 4.

In 2020 Schrader directed the Netflix miniseries Unorthodox, for which she won the Primetime Emmy Award for Outstanding Directing for a Limited Series. She directed the 2022 film She Said, starring Carey Mulligan and Zoe Kazan.

Though Schrader's most popular roles as an actor are of the Jewish faith, and many of her films as a screenwriter and director include Jewish characters and revolve around Jewish struggles, Schrader herself is not Jewish.

Awards
1992 Max Ophüls Festival, Best Young Actress for I Was on Mars 
1995 Mystfest, Best Actress for Burning Life 
1995 Bavarian Film Awards, Best Actress for Nobody Loves Me, Burning Life 
1995 German Film Awards, Best Leading Actress for Nobody Loves Me, Burning Life, Einer meiner altesten Freunde 
1999 49th Berlin International Film Festival, Silver Bear for Best Actress (shared with Juliane Köhler) for Aimée & Jaguar 
1999 German Film Awards, Best Leading Actress for Aimée & Jaguar, The Giraffe 
1999 Bavarian Film Awards, Best Actress for Aimée & Jaguar 
2020 Primetime Emmy Award, Outstanding Directing for a Limited Series, Movie, or Dramatic Special for Unorthodox

Nominations
2016 German Film Awards, Best Director for Stefan Zweig: Farewell to Europe (Original title in German: Vor der Morgenröte)

Selected filmography

References

External links

1965 births
Living people
German film actresses
German television actresses
Best Actress German Film Award winners
Silver Bear for Best Actress winners
20th-century German actresses
21st-century German actresses
Film people from Lower Saxony
Actors from Hanover